Bob Weissenfels (born April 21, 1968) is an American former bobsledder and college football player. He competed in the four man event at the 1992 Winter Olympics. Weissenfel attended the United States Naval Academy, where he played football and completed in track and field. Playing as a free safety, he led the Navy Midshipmen football team in tackles in 1988 and 1989. He was co-captain of the 1989 Navy Midshipmen football team. In track and field he competed in the decathlon.

References

1965 births
Living people
American football safeties
American male bobsledders
American male decathletes
Bobsledders at the 1992 Winter Olympics
Navy Midshipmen football players
Navy Midshipmen men's track and field athletes
Olympic bobsledders of the United States
People from Richland, Washington
Players of American football from Washington (state)
Track and field athletes from Washington (state)